The Santiam National Forest was established by the U.S. Forest Service in Oregon on July 1, 1911 with  from portions of Cascade National Forest and Oregon National Forest.  On July 1, 1933 the entire forest was combined with Cascade to establish Willamette National Forest.

References

External links
Forest History Society
Listing of the National Forests of the United States and Their Dates (from Forest History Society website) Text from Davis, Richard C., ed. Encyclopedia of American Forest and Conservation History. New York: Macmillan Publishing Company for the Forest History Society, 1983. Vol. II, pp. 743-788.

Former National Forests of Oregon
1911 establishments in Oregon
Protected areas established in 1911
1933 disestablishments in Oregon